The 2010 Wisconsin–Whitewater Warhawks football team was an American football team that represented the University of Wisconsin–Whitewater as a member of the Wisconsin Intercollegiate Athletic Conference (WIAC) during the 2010 NCAA Division III football season. In their fourth season under head coach Lance Leipold, the Warhawks compiled a perfect 15–0 record and won the NCAA Division III national championship.

Running back Lavell Coppage rushed for 299 yards in the Stagg Bowl and was received the award as the game's most outstanding player.

Schedule

Personnel

Players

 1 Shane Covington DB 5-11 170 So. Milwaukee / Riverside
 2 Tyler Huber WR 6-1 195 So. Mukwonago / North Prairie
 3 Aaron Rusch WR 5-11 168 Sr. Hartford / Hartford
 4 Chris Williams WR 5-10 177 Fr. Bolingbrook, IL / Bolingbrook
 5 Ryan Wenkman DB 5-10 184 So. Wisconsin Dells / Wisconsin Dells
 6 Sam Overton DB 5-10 175 Jr. Milwaukee / Riverside
 7 Steve Morris WR 5-11 182 Fr. Racine / Horlick
 8 Luke Menzel WR 5-10 178 Fr. Sheboygan Falls / Oostburg
 9 Steve McCollom DB 6-1 211 Jr. Farmington, MI / Shrine
 10 Aaron Samplawski DB 5-8 180 Jr. Horicon / Horicon
 11 Anthony Iannotti QB 6-3 220 Fr. Schaumburg, IL / Schaumburg
 13 Stephen Guelff ST 5-10 176 Fr. Lake Placid, FL / Lake Placid
 14 Lee Brekke QB 6-1 195 So. Sun Prairie / Sun Prairie
 14 Shane Wilson DB 6-2 186 Fr. Glendale / Nicolet
 15 Matt Blanchard QB 6-3 228 Jr. Lake Zurich, IL / Lake Zurich
 16 Cory Knapp QB 6-4 187 So. Milwaukee / St. Francis
 17 Lane Olson DB 5-10 195 Gr. Racine / Horlick
 18 Kris Rosholt P 6-3 229 Jr. Reedsburg / Reedsburg
 19 David Leaf WR 5-10 168 Sr. Winona, MN / Winona Cotter
 20 Nate Angles DB 5-10 180 Fr. Waukesha / West
 21 Chris Pendergast DB 5-9 167 So. Hartland / Arrowhead
 22 Andrew Keister DB 6-0 189 Fr. Evansville / Evansville
 23 Mathew McCulloch DB 6-3 180 Sr. Janesville / Parker
 24 Antwan Anderson RB 5-10 190 Sr. Madison / Madison Memorial
 24 Chris Treptow DB 5-10 158 Fr. New Berlin / West
 26 Edgar Wright RB 6-2 192 Fr. Palatine, IL / Fremd
 27 Ryan Horne WR 5-11 171 So. Menomonee Falls / Sussex Hamilton
 27 Ernest James DB 5-10 187 Jr. Madison / West
 28 Brandon Zolp DB 5-10 174 Fr. Adell / Kewaskum
 29 Michael Pirtle RB 5-9 167 Fr. Milwaukee / Bradley Tech
 30 Jared Kiesow DB 5-9 171 Jr. Horicon / Horicon
 31 Noah Timm DB 5-11 174 So. Two Rivers / Two Rivers
 32 Booker Stanley RB 5-9 215 Sr. Milwaukee / Whitefish Bay
 33 Levell Coppage RB 5-8 180 Jr. Oak Park, IL / Oak Park
 34 Spencer Burns FB 6-0 217 Fr. Auburn, IN / Garrett
 35 Bernie Tamsett FB 6-0 211 So. Waterford / Waterford Union
 36 Levi Johnson RB 5-7 161 Fr. River Falls / River Falls
 37 Jake Reidel FB 5-9 217 Jr. South Milwaukee / South Milwaukee
 38 Jack Sheetz FB 6-2 240 Fr. Barrington, IL / Barrington
 39 Ronnie Blaszkowski DB 5-10 170 So. Oak Park River Forest, IL / Oak Park
 40 Josh Wiggins LB 6-1 206 Fr. Ashton, IL / Oregon
 41 Eric Kindler ST 6-0 173 Fr. Germantown / Germantown
 42 Stephan Jonsson LB 6-0 210 Sr. Spain / Argeniona Bocs
 43 Jaren Borland LB 6-1 216 So. Fort Atkinson / Fort Atkinson
 44 Cole Klotz LB 6-4 206 Fr. Elm Grove / New Berlin Eisenhower
 45 Bryan Spakowcz LB 5-11 202 Fr. Pewaukee / Pewaukee
 46 Kevin Gorman WR 6-2 185 Fr. Wauwatosa / West
 47 Brad Slomkowski LB 6-0 198 Fr. Kenosha / Bradford
 48 Kyle Wismer LB 6-3 188 Fr. Spring Grove, IL / Richmond-Burton
 49 Matt Preissner DB 5-10 181 Fr. Fond du Lac / New Holstein
 50 Oscar Johnson LB 5-9 235 Fr. Milwaukee / Riverside
 51 Greg Arnold LB 6-2 224 Jr. Big Bend / Mukwonago
 52 Max Ford LB 6-0 210 Sr. Oak Park, IL / Oak Park River Forest
 53 Luke Hibner DL 6-1 240 Sr. Elmhurst, IL / York Community
 54 Kevin Utz DL 6-2 245 Jr. New Berlin / Eisenhower
 55 Josh Williams LB 6-1 224 So. Milwaukee / Mukwonago
 56 Jake Keeser DL 6-0 230 Jr. Fort Atkinson / Fort Atkinson
 57 Hans Goldenberg LB 6-0 218 So. River Forest, IL / Oak Park River Forest
 58 Joe Hansen OL 6-1 256 So. Greendale / Greendale
 59 Anthony Bounds LB 5-10 228 Fr. Milwaukee / Riverside
 60 Nick Endres DL 6-0 272 So. Waunakee / Waunakee
 61 Taylor Witty DL 6-2 244 Fr. Milwaukee / Lutheran
 62 Ryan Olson OL 6-2 275 Jr. Stoughton / Stoughton
 63 Grant Murray OL 6-2 240 Sr. Waukesha / Homestead
 64 Alex Misialek OL 6-4 315 Jr. Crystal Lake, IL / Crystal Lake South
 65 Jimmy Norris OL 6-2 281 So. Palatine, IL / William Fremd
 66 Mark Gawronski OL 6-0 270 Sr. New Berlin / Eisenhower
 67 Kyle Mathison OL 6-0 240 So. Belvidere, IL / Belvidere
 68 Kevin Rickert DL 6-2 228 Fr. Green Bay / Bay Port
 69 Joe Cychner DL 5-11 275 Fr. Genoa City / Lake Geneva Badger
 70 Grant Poenitsch OL 6-2 270 So. Sussex / Hamilton
 71 KJ Flynn OL 6-4 270 So. Saukville / Port Washington
 72 Andy Schmidt OL 6-4 242 Fr. St. Francis / St. Francis
 73 Ian Wilson OL 6-0 259 So. Richland Center / Richland Center
 74 Mike Pregont OL 6-3 255 Fr. Janesville / Craig
 75 Robbie Ustruck OL 6-2 280 Sr. West Allis / Hale
 76 Jake Wahl OL 6-2 235 So. Cudahy / Cudahy
 77 Matt Weber OL 6-3 285 Sr. Oregon / Oregon
 78 Jared Berg OL 6-5 284 Fr. Hudson / Hudson
 79 Logan Allemand OL 6-3 294 Jr. Kenosha / Tremper
 80 Ian McKechnie WR 5-9 163 Fr. New Berlin / Eisenhower
 81 Derric Junakin TE 6-4 264 Fr. Cudahy / Cudahy
 82 Adam Brandes WR 6-3 186 Sr. Burlington / Catholic Central
 83 Joel McElvany WR 6-4 242 So. Monroe / Monroe
 84 Jason Ford TE 6-3 215 Jr. Palatine, IL / Fremd
 85 Matt Winckler TE 6-4 237 Fr. DeForest / DeForest
 86 Chad McCarron WR 6-3 200 Fr. Cary, IL / Cary Grove
 87 Anton Graham TE 6-3 251 Jr. Racine / Park
 88 Robert Serdar TE 6-3 224 So. Zion Benton Township /
 89 John Novak TE 6-5 278 Sr. Michigan City, IN / Michigan City
 90 Johan Lorenzo DL 6-3 235 So. Hialeah, FL / Hialeah Senior
 91 Jon Baldwin DL 6-3 247 Sr. Spring Grove, IL / Richmond Burton
 92 Zack Cook DL 6-0 260 Jr. Necedah / Necedah
 93 Anthony Dowery DL 6-0 260 So. Milwaukee / South Division
 94 Tom Egan DL 6-0 255 Fr. Coon Rapids, MN / Coon Rapids
 95 Wesley Hicks DL 6-3 274 Sr. Milwaukee / Vincent
 96 Gabe Woullard DL 6-2 195 Fr. Oak Park, IL / Oak Park River Forest
 97 Loussaint Minett DL 5-11 213 Fr. Whitewater / Whitewater
 98 Jake Hohlstein DL 6-1 275 So. Portage / Portage
 99 Casey Casper DL 6-4 237 Jr. Dousman / Kettle Moraine

Coaching staff
 Head coach: Lance Leipold
 Athletic director: Paul Plinske
 Assistant coaches
 Brian Borland (defensive coordinator)
 Steve Dinkel (offensive coordinator)
 Nelson Edmonds (special teams coordinator and running backs coach)
 Kevin Bullis (defensive run game coordinator)
 Dan Brunner (tight ends coach)
 Jace Rindahl (linebackers coach)
 Tom Karthausser (defensive ends coach)
 Josh Gehring (quarterbacks coach and pass game coordinator)
 Lee Munger (strength and conditioning)

References

Wisconsin–Whitewater
Wisconsin–Whitewater Warhawks football seasons
NCAA Division III Football Champions
College football undefeated seasons
Wisconsin–Whitewater Warhawks football